Nong Yaeng is a tambon (subdistrict) of San Sai District, in Chiang Mai Province, Thailand. In 2005 it had a population of 5,117 people. The tambon contains 11 villages.

References

Tambon of Chiang Mai province
Populated places in Chiang Mai province